Rizky Ramdani Lestaluhu (born 5 November 1991 in Tulehu) is an Indonesian professional footballer who plays an attacking midfielder or as a winger for Liga 1 club Bali United.

Personal life
Lestaluhu was born to Abdul Latif Lestaluhu and Healthy Ohorella as the first child of eight. Nicknamed Dani by his friends Lestaluhu was discovered by Iwan Setiawan, a former U-17 national team coach, who saw him playing. Lestaluhu is Muslim. His younger brothers Rafid Lestaluhu, Abduh Lestaluhu, and Pandi Lestaluhu are also professional footballers.

International career
Lestaluhu  made his international debut for Indonesia on 28 November 2014, in a match against Laos in the 2014 AFF Suzuki Cup. He scored two goals in a 5-1 win.

Career statistics

International

International goals
International under-23 goals

International goals

Honours

International
Indonesia U-23
 Southeast Asian Games  Silver medal: 2011, 2013
 Islamic Solidarity Games  Silver medal: 2013

Club

Persija Jakarta
 Liga 1: 2018
 Indonesia President's Cup: 2018
Menpora Cup: 2021

References

External links 
 
 

Indonesian footballers
Living people
1991 births
Indonesian Muslims
Sriwijaya F.C. players
Persija Jakarta players
Bali United F.C. players
PSS Sleman players
Liga 1 (Indonesia) players
People from Tulehu
Sportspeople from Maluku (province)
Footballers at the 2014 Asian Games
Indonesia youth international footballers
Indonesia international footballers
Association football forwards
Association football wingers
Southeast Asian Games silver medalists for Indonesia
Southeast Asian Games medalists in football
Competitors at the 2011 Southeast Asian Games
Competitors at the 2013 Southeast Asian Games
Asian Games competitors for Indonesia
21st-century Indonesian people